Linguolabials or apicolabials are consonants articulated by placing the tongue tip or blade against the upper lip, which is drawn downward to meet the tongue. They represent one extreme of a coronal articulatory continuum which extends from linguolabial to subapical palatal places of articulation. Cross-linguistically, linguolabial consonants are very rare, but they do not represent a particularly exotic combination of articulatory configurations, unlike click consonants or ejectives. They are found in a cluster of languages in Vanuatu, in the Kajoko dialect of Bijago in Guinea-Bissau, in Umotína (a recently extinct Bororoan language of Brazil), and as paralinguistic sounds elsewhere. They are also relatively common in disordered speech, and the diacritic is specifically provided for in the extensions to the IPA.

Linguolabial consonants are transcribed in the International Phonetic Alphabet by adding the "seagull" diacritic, to the corresponding alveolar consonant, or with the apical diacritic, on the corresponding bilabial consonant.

Description 

Linguolabials are produced by constricting the airflow between the tongue and the upper lip. They are attested in a number of manners of articulation including stops, nasals, and fricatives, and can be produced with the tip of the tongue (apical), blade of the tongue (laminal), or the bottom of the tongue (sublaminal). Acoustically they are more similar to alveolars than bilabials. Linguolabials can be distinguished from bilabials and alveolars acoustically by formant transitions and nasal resonances.

List of consonants

Sound shifts
In Vanuatu, some of the Santo–Malekula languages have shifted historically from labial to dental consonants via an intermediate linguolabial stage, which remains in other Santo and Malekula languages. In Nese, for example, labials have become linguolabial before nonrounded vowels; in Tolomako, this has gone further, so that (POc *bebe >) p̈ep̈e 'butterfly' ( in Tangoa) later became  in Tolomako; likewise, (POc *tama >) tam̈a 'father' (Tangoa ) became .

See also
 Place of articulation
 List of phonetics topics

Notes

References
 
 
 

Place of articulation
Linguolabial consonants